Cerithiopsis horrida is a species of sea snail, a gastropod (gastropoda orthogastropoda) in the family Cerithiopsidae cerithiopsinae, which is known from European oceans. It was described by Monterosato in 1874.

References
Citations

Sources
 Monterosato T. A. (di) (1874 (luglio)). Recherches conchyliologiques, effectuées au Cap Santo Vito, en Sicile. (Traduz. dall'italiano di H. Crosse). Journal de Conchyliologie 22 (3) : 243-282 (luglio) 22 (4)

horrida
Gastropods described in 1874